Total Entertainment! is a studio album by American queercore band Pansy Division. It was released in 2003 by Alternative Tentacles.

Critical reception
Now called the album "a goofy alt-rock amusement park ride of a record, with more hooks than a crocheting bee in a doily-happy nursing home and the gayest lyrics this side of Rufus Wainwright." The Richmond Times-Dispatch called it "pipin' with hilarity and crunching power pop." The Advocate called it the band's "most varied effort to date."

Track listing

0 is about 40 seconds of silence, followed by what sounds like a movie sample, set in a record store, in which a woman offers to play the new Pansy Division they just got in and a man declines.  16 is preceded by a 2:55 silent pre-gap.

Personnel
Pansy Division
Chris Freeman – bass, vocals
Jon Ginoli – rhythm guitar, vocals
Patrick Goodwin – lead guitar, vocals
Luis Illades – drums, saxophone, vocals

Additional musicians
Victor Krummenacher – acoustic guitar on track 6
Scott Wagar – tambourine on tracks 2 and 4
Danny Cao – trumpet on tracks 7, 8 and 10
Doug Hilsinger – pedal steel guitar on track 14
Josh Pollock – banjo on track 14
Chris Xefos – keyboards

References

2003 albums
Pansy Division albums
Alternative Tentacles albums